CCAT can refer to:
Cambridgeshire College of Arts and Technology
Cambridgeshire College of Arts and Technology Boat Club, the rowing club of Anglia Ruskin University
Campus Center for Appropriate Technology
Cerro Chajnantor Atacama Telescope
CCAT (public school district), a public school district administering a charter school in Statesboro, Georgia, U.S.
Cadet Centre for Adventurous Training
Criteria Cognitive Aptitude Test